The Irish Singles Chart is the Republic of Ireland's music industry standard singles popularity chart issued weekly by the Irish Recorded Music Association (IRMA) and compiled on their behalf by the Official Charts Company. Chart rankings are based on sales, which are compiled through over-the-counter retail data captured electronically each day from retailers' EPOS systems. All major record shops, digital retailers and streaming services contribute to the chart, accounting for over 95% of the market. A new chart is compiled and officially released to the public by the Irish Recorded Music Association on Friday at noon. Each chart is dated with the "week-ending" date of the previous Thursday (i.e., the day before issue). The singles chart was first published on 1 October 1962, and covered the top ten singles of the previous week by record label shipments.

History
The charts were first broadcast on RTÉ on 1 October 1962. Before this charts had been printed in the Evening Herald newspaper, but it is debated as to whether they are official or not. Up until 1972 the Irish Chart was based on telephone sales received from record retailers based on over the counter sales to the public. The compilers of the chart changed several times and in January 1972 the chart changed to one based on sales from manufacturers to retailers. From October 1975 to February 1977 the chart was compiled from votes from readers in the Evening Herald newspaper. There was a separate Irish and International artists chart for a time during this period. From 1977 the chart once again became based on sales from retailers to the public but during the early 1980s this again changed and was once more based on sales from manufacturers to retailers. RTÉ 2fm broadcasts the top 30 of the chart every Friday night from 8pm to 10pm.

In 1992, the singles chart became based on consumer sales after IFPI and the Irish Recorded Music Association (IRMA) granted a contract to Gallup, a market research company. Gallup installed Epson PX-4 devices in sixty record stores to collect singles sales data. In 1996, Chart-Track was formed as a result of a management buy-out from Gallup. Also in 1996, with the development of technology, EPOS systems were installed in multiple music retail stores. The EPOS systems allowed for the collection of more accurate sales information. Chart-Track collects data daily from major record stores such as HMV and Tower Records, as well as over forty Independent retailers. In total, data from over four-hundred and ninety stores are collected each week. The singles chart is compiled over seven days and released every Friday at noon by the IRMA, while Midweek Charts are produced daily, but only released to IRMA members.

It was announced that from 1 July 2006, downloads would be counted in the charts. They would also feature in their own chart in addition to being counted for the overall chart. Data was initially collected from iTunes, Vodafone, eircom, Sony Connect, Wippit and Bleep.com. Although IRMA estimated the size of the download market to amount to only 14% of the total market in 2006, this has increased in more recent years.

In 2014, the Irish charts first included music streaming data and in 2018, music video streaming data was included for the first time.

Chart achievements
All information is from 1962 to the present and does not include charts printed in the Evening Herald newspaper.

First Irish artist to debut at number one
Dickie Rock & the Miami Showband with "Every Step of the Way" (1965)

Artists with the most number one hits

Source:

Songs with the most weeks at number one

Note: Songs denoted with an asterisk (*) spent non-consecutive weeks at number one.

Source:

Acts to occupy the top two positions
Lady Gaga — "Just Dance" and "Poker Face" (two weeks in February 2009).
Pharrell Williams — "Get Lucky" (with Daft Punk) and "Blurred Lines" (with Robin Thicke & T.I.) (one week in May 2013); "Blurred Lines" and "Get Lucky" (six weeks in May and June 2013).
Justin Bieber
"Sorry" and "Love Yourself" (one week in December 2015); "Love Yourself" and  "Sorry" (seven weeks in December 2015 and January 2016).
"Cold Water" (with MØ & Major Lazer) and "Let Me Love You" (with DJ Snake) (two weeks in August 2016).
"Despacito" (with Luis Fonsi & Daddy Yankee) and "I'm the One" (with DJ Khaled, Lil Wayne, Quavo & Chance the Rapper) (five weeks in May and June 2017).
Ed Sheeran
"Shape of You" and "Castle on the Hill" (seven weeks in January, February and March 2017): "Galway Girl" and "Shape of You" (two weeks in March 2017); "Shape of You" and "Galway Girl" (five weeks in March and April 2017).
"Perfect" and "River" (with Eminem) (four non-consecutive weeks in December 2017 and January 2018).
Ariana Grande — "Break Up with Your Girlfriend, I'm Bored" and "7 Rings" (one week in February 2019); "7 Rings" and "Break Up with Your Girlfriend, I'm Bored" (one week in February 2019).
Dermot Kennedy — "Giants" and "Paradise" (four weeks in December 2020).
Taylor Swift - “Anti-Hero” and “Lavender Haze” (one week in October 2022) 

In addition, in the fifth and seventh week that Justin Bieber was at #1 and #2 with "Love Yourself" and "Sorry", "What Do You Mean" was at #3. For the sixth week that Ed Sheeran was at #1 and #2 with "Galway Girl" and "Shape of You", he also occupied #3 to #16 with the remaining tracks from "÷". In the second week, "Castle on the Hill", "Nancy Mulligan" and "New Man" occupied #3, #4 and #5 respectively and "Castle on the Hill" remained at #3 for the third week.

Artists with the most top fifty hits

See also
List of artists who reached number one in Ireland
List of songs that reached number one on the Irish Singles Chart

References

External links
Current Irish Singles Chart – Top 30 Positions
Official Irish Singles Chart Top 50

Singles Chart

pt:Irish Recorded Music Association#Irish Charts